The Bond Boy is a lost 1922 American silent drama film directed by Henry King and starring Richard Barthelmess. It was produced by Barthelmess and Charles Duell and released through Associated First National Pictures.

Cast
Richard Barthelmess as Peter Newbolt/John Newbolt
Charles Hill Mailes as Isom Chase
Ned Sparks as Cyrus Morgan
Lawrence D'Orsay as Colonel Price
Bob Williamson as Lawyer Hammer (*Robert Williamson)
Leslie King as District Attorney
Jerry Sinclair as Sheriff
Tom Maguire as Saul Greening (*as Thomas Maguire)
Lucia Backus Seger as Mrs. Greening
Virginia Magee as Alice Price
Mary Alden as Mrs. Newboat
Mary Thurman as Ollie Chase

References

External links
 The Bond Boy at IMDb.com

1922 films
American silent feature films
Lost American films
Films directed by Henry King
Films based on American novels
First National Pictures films
Silent American drama films
1922 drama films
1922 lost films
Lost drama films
1920s American films
1920s English-language films